The Holdovers is an upcoming American comedy-drama film directed by Alexander Payne, written by David Hemingson and starring Paul Giamatti.

It will be given a limited release in theatres on November 10, 2023, followed by a wide release on November 22.

Premise
The disliked Deerfield Academy teacher Paul Hunham is put in charge of supervising Angus, a smart and rebellious student unable to journey home for Christmas. Joining them is Mary, the school's head cook.

Cast
 Paul Giamatti as Paul Hunham, a heavily disliked teacher at Deerfield Academy
 Dominic Sessa as Angus, a smart but troublemaking student who is unable to come home for Christmas
 Da'Vine Joy Randolph as Mary, the school's head cook whose son recently died in the Vietnam War
 Carrie Preston as Lydia Crane, the school office administrator who also works as a waitress

Production
The Holdovers is the second collaboration between director Alexander Payne and actor Paul Giamatti after Sideways (2004). Payne got the idea after watching a 1930s French film and contacted David Hemingson to write the screenplay, which was originally a writing sample for a television pilot. In June 2021, Miramax acquired the distribution rights. In early 2022, Da'Vine Joy Randolph and Carrie Preston joined the cast. Filming began in Massachusetts on January 27, 2022.

Release
On September 11, 2022, a special screening of the film was held for buyers; the following day, it was reported that Focus Features had acquired the distribution rights for $30 million. On February 23, 2023, it was announced the film would receive a limited theatrical release on November 10, 2023, followed by an expansion to wide release on November 22.

References

External links
 

Upcoming films
American comedy-drama films
Films directed by Alexander Payne
Films produced by Bill Block
Films set in 1970
Films set in boarding schools
Films set in New England
Films shot in Massachusetts
Focus Features films
Miramax films
Upcoming English-language films